Poonch District (or Poonch Jagir) was a district of the princely state of Jammu and Kashmir, which is currently divided between India and Pakistan. The Pakistani part of the erstwhile district is now the Poonch Division in the Azad Kashmir territory, whilst the Indian part of the district is the Poonch district in Jammu and Kashmir.  The capital of the Pakistan-controlled side is Rawalakot; while the capital of the Indian side is Poonch.

In ancient times, Poonch was part of the Abhisara region and formed part of Alexander the Great's conquests. In later sources, the region is called Paranotsa, but also known by its capital city, Lohara, which gave rise to the Lohara dynasty of Kashmir ( 1003–1320 CE). Afterwards Poonch came under the control of the Mughal Empire, then the Durrani Empire and finally the Sikh Empire. The Sikh monarch, Maharaja Ranjit Singh gave Poonch to the Dogra noble, Raja Dhyan Singh, as a fief. After the death of Ranjit Singh, Dhyan Singh was murdered in Sikh intrigues, and the region was transferred to Gulab Singh as part of the Jammu and Kashmir state under British suzerainty. After the departure of the British in August 1947, the tribesmen of Poonch rebelled, inviting Pakistani assistance and giving rise to the Indo-Pakistani War of 1947. The war ended a year later with the region being divided between India and Pakistan.

Early history

Ancient History
When Alexander invaded the lower Jhelum belt to fight Porus, the Jhelum valley region was known as Abhisara. It is likely that the Kashmir Valley was under the control of this region. The Abhisaras submitted to the invader, along with Ambhi of Takshashila (Taxila), and the region was consolidated into the Alexander's empire.

The Rajatarangini mentions Poonch under the name Paranotsa. Xuanzang in the 7th century transliterated it as Pun-nu-tso.

Based on the Mahabharata evidence, and evidence from 7th century Chinese traveler  Xuanzang, the districts of Rajouri, Poonch and Abhisara had been under the sway of the Republican Kambojas during epic times.

At the time of Xuanzang's visit, the Kashmir Valley controlled all the territories adjacent to it in the south and the west, including Taxila, which is said to have been subjugated at a recent date.

Sovereign State
Around 850CE, Poonch became a sovereign state ruled by Raja Nar, who was basically a horse trader. According to Rajatrangani, Raja Trilochanpal of Poonch gave a tough fight to Mahmood Ghaznavi who invaded this area in 1020.  Ghaznavi failed to enter Kashmir, as he could not capture the fort of Lohara (modern day Loran, in district of Poonch).

Mughal Era
In 1596, Mughal emperor Jahangir made Siraj-Ud-Din the ruler of Poonch. Siraj-Ud-Din and his descendants Raja Shahbaz Khan, Raja Abdul Razak, Raja Rustam Khan and Raja Khan Bahadur Khan ruled this area up to 1792.

Sikh Empire (1819–1846)
In 1819 this area was captured by Maharaja Ranjit Singh. Brothers Gulab Singh, Dhyan Singh and Suchet Singh, belonging to the House of Jammu, enrolled in the Maharaja's army and rose to high positions.

In 1822, Ranjit Singh appointed Gulab Singh as the Raja of Jammu and, in 1827, appointed Dhyan Singh as the Raja of Bhimber, Chibbal and Poonch (covering the Mirpur and Poonch districts as of 1947).
Dhyan Singh spent most of his time in Lahore, subsequently becoming the diwan (prime minister) in the Sikh court. Gulab Singh is said to have managed his jagirs on his behalf. In 1837, the hill tribes of Poonch launched a rebellion, which Gulab Singh suppressed with some cruelty.

After the death of  Ranjit Singh in 1839, the Sikh court fell into anarchy and palace intrigues took over. Dhyan Singh, Suchet Singh as well as Dhyan Singh's son Hira Singh were murdered in these struggles. Poonch was confiscated by the Sikh Durbar on the grounds that the Rajas had rebelled against the state and handed it over to Faiz Talib Khan of Rajouri.

Princely state of Jammu and Kashmir (1846–1947)
After the First Anglo-Sikh War (1845–1846) and the subsequent Treaties of Lahore and Amritsar, the entire territory between the Beas and the Indus rivers was transferred to Gulab Singh, including Poonch. He was recognised an independent ruler, a maharaja, of the newly created state of Jammu and Kashmir. Gulab Singh reinstated the jagir of Poonch to Jawahir Singh, the eldest remaining son of Dhyan Singh.

The brothers Jawahir Singh and Moti Singh were not satisfied. They put forward a claim to being independent rulers of Poonch, maintaining that they were entitled to a share in the 'family property' of all the territories controlled by Gulab Singh. The matter was adjudicated by Sir Frederick Currie, the British Resident in Lahore, in 1852, who confirmed that Gulab Singh was indeed their suzerain. The brothers were to give the Maharaja Gulab Singh a horse with gold trappings every year and consult him on all matters of importance. The House of Poonch however continued to contest this arrangement right up to 1940.

In 1852, the brothers Jawahir Singh and Moti Singh quarrelled and the Punjab Board of Revenue awarded a settlement. Moti Singh was awarded the territory of the Poonch district, and Jawahir Singh that of the Mirpur district. Christopher Snedden remarks that Moti Singh's territory amounted to two-thirds of Dhyan Singh's estate.

In 1859, Jawahir Singh was accused of 'treacherous conspiracy' by Maharaja Ranbir Singh (r. 1857–1885), who succeeded Gulab Singh. The British agreed with the assessment and forced Jawahir Singh into exile in Ambala. Ranbir Singh paid Jawahir Singh an annual stipend of Rs. 100,000 until his death, and confiscated his territory (the Mirpur district) afterwards because Jawahir Singh had no heirs.

Moti Singh's son, Baldev Singh contested this action claiming that the territory should return to him as the sole surviving descendant of Dhyan Singh. The British did not accept the claim saying that Jawahir Singh forfeited his territory when he agreed to the annual stipend.

Autonomy disputes 
After Maharaja Ranbir Singh was succeeded by Pratap Singh (r. 1885–1925), a 'Council of Administration' was imposed on Jammu and Kashmir by the British. The Council is said to have started encroaching on Poonch, egged on by Pratap Singh's brother Amar Singh. Complaints were made to the British, who continued the original line that Poonch was a feudatory of Jammu and Kashmir and so it was an internal affair of Jammu and Kashmir.

Raja Baldev Singh (r. 1892–1918), who succeeded Moti Singh, complained in 1895 that Jammu and Kashmir started referring to Poonch as a jagir, whereas he maintained that it was a 'state'. This was apparently a very emotive issue for Baldev Singh and, subsequently, to the residents of Poonch. Baldev Singh's successor Sukhdev Singh (r. 1918–1927) and Jagatdev Singh (r. 1928–1940) continued the complaints. In 1927, the British resident in Kashmir Evelyn Howell got involved and he advised Maharaja Hari Singh that, while Poonch was clearly subsidiary to Jammu and Kashmir, it was only referred to as an illaqa in the original grant, not as a jagir.

Jagatdev Singh ascended as the Raja in 1928 at a young age, and the reigning Maharaja Hari Singh (r. 1925–1949), son of Amar Singh, imposed a sanad (instruction) on him. The sanad mentioned, among others, that Poonch was a jagir and implemented several encroachments on the administration of Poonch. Frictions continued. In 1936, Jagatdev Singh sent a 'memorial' to the Viceroy of India, seeking a review of the relationship between Poonch and Jammu and Kashmir. The Government of India responded that, since Poonch was part of the state of Jammu and Kashmir, all submissions should be made through the British Resident of Jammu and Kashmir government. The Resident stated that the order of 1928, eventually based on Currie's original award, definitely settled the status of Poonch as a 'subordinate Jagirdar of Kashmir'. Jagatdev Singh's claims were dismissed without further comment.

With the death of Jagatdev Singh in 1940, his son Shiv Ratandev Singh became the new Raja while being a minor. Maharaja Hari Singh appointed a guardian, who was his military secretary, to look after the Raja's 'property'. The Raja's mother was prohibited from participating in the minority administration. In July 1940, a gathering of Poonch public passed a resolution expressing 'profound sorrow and deep indignation and resentment' at the Maharaja's proclamation and his description of Poonch as a jagir. By 1945, the Maharaja's administration was deeply unpopular in Poonch, especially among the families of military servicemen, who contrasted it with that of their counterparts in Punjab.

Administration
Until Jagatdev Singh's accession in 1928, the Poonch jagir was autonomous, except for the payment of a token tribute of Rs. 231 to the Maharaja of Jammu and Kashmir. The jagir had its own officials, including a bureaucracy, police and a standing army of one company. It is said that the local officials, most of whom were Hindus, were disgruntled because their salaries were lower than in the rest of state. This led to inefficiency and corruption.

The Raja of Poonch owned all the land in the jagir. The actual 'holders of land' were referred to as assamis (agents) of the Raja. In the 1930s, 40 percent of the earnings were collected as tax, amounting to Rs. 1 million. Whereas proprietary rights were granted to landholders elsewhere in Kashmir following the Glancy Commission recommendations in 1933, the Poonchis did not benefit from the reforms due to the jagir's autonomy. For some unknown reason, the residents of the Mendhar tehsil were granted ownership rights, which caused further resentment in the other tehsils.

After 1928, Maharaja Hari Singh started encroaching on the administration of Poonch and, a dual system of rule was established. A resident administrator of the Maharaja was appointed in the Poonch jagir and further officials were loaned from the state. The Raja's courts had jurisdiction only in petty cases. All serious crimes were referred to the courts in Srinagar. The Raja of Poonch lost his prestige and power.

The Maharaja also imposed additional taxes to generate his own revenue from the jagir. They included taxes on cattle and sheep, export/import taxes on items like soap and silk, and imaginative taxes on wives and widows. A 'horse tax' required a payment of 50 percent of the purchase price of a horse. Evidently, these taxes generated considerable resentment.

Economy
Scholar Christopher Snedden states that, being a mountainous area, Poonch accorded small farms with poor soil, but had high costs of living. The Kashmiri tax burden made the situation worse. Many Poonchi men worked outside the jagir to alleviate the situation. They worked in Punjab, the railways, British Indian army and the British merchant navy in Bombay. The army was an especially important employer. It was said that every male Muslim in the jagir was, had been or would be a soldier in the British Indian army. During the World War I, 31,000 men from Jammu and Kashmir served in the army, a great majority of them from Poonch. During the World War II, over 60,000 men from Poonch served in the army, while the rest of the state contributed only about 10,000 men. The physical proximity of Poonch to the military recruiting grounds in Punjab, such as Sialkot and Rawalpindi, facilitated their enrolment. Poonchis enlisted as 'Punjabi Musalmans' and served in the Punjab Regiment.

Division of Poonch

After independence in 1947, there was a rebellion in the western part of the-then Poonch district. The rebels led by Sardar Muhammad Ibrahim Khan, sought support from the Dominion of Pakistan, which provided arms, and then launched an invasion of its own using Pashtun tribals. In response, the Maharaja of Jammu and Kashmir joined India, and the conflict turned into an Indo-Pakistani War. When a ceasefire was effected, the Poonch district was split across the two countries. The former capital city, Poonch, came under the Indian Poonch district. A new capital at Rawalakot was established by Pakistan in the Pakistani Poonch district. The district itself was eventually converted into a 'Poonch Division' and divided into four separate districts: Poonch, Sudhanoti, Bagh and Haveli.

References

Bibliography

External links
 Present day districts on OpenStreetMap: Bagh, Haveli, Poonch (Pakistan), Sudhanoti,  Poonch (India)

Poonch District
Poonch District
Poonch district, India
Poonch District, Pakistan
Poonch District

hi:पुंछ जिला
nl:Poonch (district in India)